Fabio Virgili (born 26 April 1986) is an Italian footballer who plays as a goalkeeper.

Club career
Born in Terni, Umbria, Virgili started his professional career at Emilia–Romagna club Parma. In the summer of 2005, he left the Primavera Youth Team and joined Serie C1 side Napoli in a 4-year co-ownership deal, for a peppercorn fee of €500; he won the league title with the club as an unused squad member, earning promotion to Serie B. In June 2006, he was bought back by Parma for €50,000 and became the club's third goalkeeper behind Luca Bucci and Alfonso De Lucia. He made his single appearance for the club that season in the second leg of the Coppa Italia quarter-final, in which Parma drew 2–2 with A.S. Roma, who won 4–3 on aggregate and went on to win the competition. In the next season, he was the backup of Bucci and Nicola Pavarini, along with Radek Petr and Eros Corradini.

In July 2008, he joined Carpenedolo along with Parma team-mate Thomas Som. Although he played as a regular starter for the Lega Pro Seconda Divisione side, he joined hometown club Sporting Terni in August 2009.

On 19 August 2010 he was signed by Paganese. The following season he was signed by Ternana Calcio, as the backup of Stefano Ambrosi, along with Carlo Camilli.

In the summer of 2012 he left Ternana Calcio and joined Botev Vratsa in the Bulgarian Second Division, but he never played for the club, and in March 2013 he returned in Italy to play with Narnese.

International career
Virgili was an unused member of Italy U20 team at 2005 FIFA World Youth Championship. Along with Daniele Padelli, they were Emiliano Viviano's backup. He was the first choice goalkeeper at 2003 UEFA European Under-17 Football Championship, ahead Giacomo Bindi. He also capped at 2005 UEFA European Under-19 Football Championship elite qualification, ahead Davide Petrachi.

Honours
Botev Vratsa
 Lega Pro Prima Divisione: 2012

Narnese
 Eccellenza Umbra: 2013

References

 sporterni.it

External links
 Profile at La Gazzetta dello Sport 2006-07 
 
 Profile at FIGC 
 LaSerieD.com Profile 
 

1986 births
Living people
Italian footballers
Italy youth international footballers
Italian expatriate footballers
Serie C players
Parma Calcio 1913 players
S.S.C. Napoli players
Ternana Calcio players
Expatriate footballers in Bulgaria
Association football goalkeepers
People from Terni
Footballers from Umbria
Sportspeople from the Province of Terni